The Sangguniang Kabataan Open University is an open online learning platform based in the Philippines, that aims to make learning materials and courses available to Sangguniang Kabataan officers.

The Sangguniang Kabataan Open University is managed by a network of content providers that have a strong track record in development work in various sectors.

SKOU aims to help the SK Officers by:
 aggregating relevant materials for SK Officers
 packaging material in the form that is useful
 running online courses that will benefit SK Officers

Main governance principles covered in the SK Open University are:

 transparency
 citizen's participation
 innovation
 community development

The Sangguniang Kabataan Open University aims to evolve content that is role-centric, so that SK performing specific roles will be able to find guidance in this learning venue.

The roles are guided by the following definitions.

Katipunan ng Kabataan (Youth Federation).  Each barangay in the Philippines is mandated by law to have its own chapter of the Katipunan ng Kabataan in which the members elect their officers called as the Sangguniang Kabataan.  The Sangguniang Kabataan is an offshoot of the KB or the Kabataang Barangay (Village Youth) which was abolished when the Local Government Code of 1991 was enacted.

The Sangguniang Kabataan is the youth legislature in every local village or community.  It also initiates policies, programs and projects for the development of youth in their respective political territories.  The Chairman of the Sangguniang Kabataan acts as the Chief Executive of the Sanggunian (Council) while the Kagawad (Councilor) as the legislative council.  The Kagawads approve resolutions of the Sanggunian and appropriates the money allotted to the council, a share in the revenue of the Barangay.

The Chairman automatically sits in the Sangguniang Barangay (Village Council) as ex officio member.  He automatically gets chairmanship of the Committee on Youth and Sports, one of the standing committees in the village council.  Every Sangguniang Kabataan is then federated into municipal and city federations, then city and municipal federations are federated into a provincial federation.

The barangay SK Chairman represents the barangay in the municipal or city federation.  The presidents of the city and municipal federation presidents becomes member of the provincial federation and the provincial federation president.  The presidents of highly urbanized and independent component cities composed the membership in the national federation and elect the national federation president who automatically sits in the National Youth Commission as ex officio member of the commission.

Except national federation, each level of the federation form municipal, city to provincial is governed by the Local Executive Committee composed mostly of the seven regularly elected officers of the federation.

Since 1992, there have been three simultaneous nationwide SK elections held in the Philippines which each term lasting from three to five years due to amendment of the regular 3-year term of the council.  After every election, association officers are chosen.  The elected presidents of the municipal associations sit as ex officio members of the municipal councils, while the provincial president sits on the provincial board.  All of these ex officio members automatically chair the respective councils' committees on youth and sports development.

External links
Philippine National Youth Commission
Sangguniang Kabataan Open University

Universities and colleges in the Philippines